Voiteg is a commune in Timiș County, Romania. It is composed of two villages: Folea and Voiteg (commune seat).

History 
Voiteg has existed since the 14th century, being first mentioned in 1322. Its name was Veytech, after the owner Teodor Veytey. At that time, Voiteg was not where it is today, but a little further west of the railway. In 1332, in the papal tithe registers, the parish of Veytech is mentioned again. According to Hungarian chronicles, in the past, the locals were part of the communes of Bolta and Vârceg, a proof of this being the local name that the inhabitants bore until the 20th century: vârcegani, those in the west and bolianți, those in the east. No other data is known about these two communes.

In 1842, German colonists began settling in Voiteg. The German population emigrated for the most part between 1990–1991. A 5.6-magnitude earthquake damaged more than 500 houses in Voiteg on 2 December 1991.

Demographics 

Voiteg had a population of 2,437 inhabitants at the 2011 census, up 0.4% from the 2002 census. Most inhabitants are Romanians (86.05%), larger minorities being represented by Hungarians (5.91%), Roma (2.63%) and Germans (2.01%). For 2.63% of the population, ethnicity is unknown. By religion, most inhabitants are Orthodox (80.18%), but there are also minorities of Roman Catholics (9.52%), Pentecostals (3.08%) and Evangelics (2.67%). For 2.63% of the population, religious affiliation is unknown.

References 

Communes in Timiș County
Localities in Romanian Banat